Colletinae is a subfamily of bees  belonging to the family Colletidae.

Genera
Genera within this subfamily include: 
 Brachyglossula Hedicke, 1922
 Callomelitta Smith, 1853
 Chrysocolletes Michener, 1965
 Colletes Latreille, 1802
 Eulonchopria Brèthes, 1909
 Glossurocolletes Michener, 1965
 Hesperocolletes Michener, 1965
 Leioproctus Smith, 1853
 Lonchopria Vachal, 1905
 Lonchorhyncha Michener, 1989
 Mourecotelles Toro & Cabezas, 1977
 Neopasiphae Perkins, 1912
 Niltonia Moure, 1964
 Paracolletes Smith, 1853
 Phenacolletes Cockerell, 1905
 Trichocolletes Cockerell, 1912

References

Colletidae
Hymenoptera subfamilies